Good Manners is a 2017 dark fantasy horror film written and directed by Juliana Rojas and Marco Dutra, starring Isabél Zuaa, Marjorie Estiano, Miguel Lobo and Cida Moreira.

The film follows a woman named Clara who takes a job as a housekeeper and nanny for a wealthy woman, only to realize that the job and the pregnancy are more complicated than she initially believed.

The film premiered at the 70th Locarno International Film Festival, where it won the Special Jury Prize. It was released in France on 21 March 2018 by Jour2Fête and in Brazil on 7 June 2018 by Imovision.

Plot
Clara interviews for a nanny job despite having no experience or references. Just as she is about to be turned down for the job, the woman interviewing her, Ana, experiences cramping. A sympathetic Clara guides her through the pain, and Ana decides to hire her as a live-in housekeeper and future nanny.

On her 29th birthday, Ana gets drunk and reveals to Clara that she is estranged from her family. Originally engaged to a man, she cheated on him and conceived a child from her affair. Her parents sent her to the city to have an abortion, but they severed ties with her after she refused to go through with it.

Ana is ordered by her doctors not to consume meat. One night, Clara finds her rifling through the fridge. When Clara tries to guide her to bed, Ana kisses her but then scratches her hard enough to draw blood. The following morning, Ana does not appear to remember the incident.

Clara realizes that the incident might be connected to the full moon. The following full moon, Ana passionately kisses Clara and the two have sex. Later that night, Ana sleepwalks again. Clara witnesses her murdering and eating a cat. The following day, Clara tells Ana about her sleepwalking. She also puts some of her blood into Ana's meal to relieve her thirst for blood and sleepwalking.

On the following full moon night, Ana's cramping worsens. Before Clara can call for help, Ana's stomach ruptures. Ana is killed, but her baby, a werewolf pup, survives. Clara decides to run away and abandon the baby, but changes her mind on the last part upon hearing the child's cries and decides to raise it herself, naming him Joel.

Seven years later, Clara works as a nurse and is raising Joel as her own. She has raised him as a vegetarian and chains him up in what is known as "the Little Bedroom" during full moons to protect him. After Clara's landlady Dona Amélia gives Joel meat one day, he searches through Clara's things, where he uncovers a photo of Ana, becoming hostile with Clara. The next morning (as Joel began to transform while arguing with her) Clara reluctantly admits that Ana is his birth mother, but insists that she does not know who his father is.

Joel decides to search for his father, the only clue being a receipt from a shopping mall where Ana bought shoes. He and his friend Maurício go to the mall, but they are locked in when they decide to stay inside past closing time. Joel transforms as it is still a full moon, and soon after he pursues Maurício and eats him whole. He returns home alone before he unconsciously transforms back but is seen by Dona Amélia, who discovers his secret and wants to perform an exorcism on him (as Joel's traits are affected by his transformation). Clara injects the landlady with an anasthetic and then plans to run away with Joel the next day, but because he does not fully remember what he did in his wolf form he locks her in the Little Bedroom in a fit of confusion and anger. Joel tries to attend a dance with his classmate Amanda later that night but quickly realizes what he really is, and begs her to leave before he once again turns. Clara, who has managed to escape, shoots him in the leg before he can kill again, non-fatally injuring him.

Clara takes Joel home to the Little Bedroom and removes the bullet, healing the wound. Meanwhile, a terrified Amanda tells the locals what happened, leading them to hunt Joel down, tracking down his and Clara's apartment (though it is implied Amanda does not want them to do so) as Dona Amélia wakes up and watches with implicit regret. With a lullaby Ana sang earlier in the film, Clara manages to tame Joel so that he does not attack her. She finally decides that she cannot keep him locked up and hungry. As the locals bang on the door, Clara and Joel prepare to face them together as Joel lets out one final howl.

Cast
 Isabél Zuaa as Clara
 Marjorie Estiano as Ana
 Miguel Lobo as Joel
 Cida Moreira as Dona Amélia
 Andréa Marquee as Ângela
 Felipe Kenji as Maurício
 Nina Medeiros as Amanda
 Neusa Velasco as Dona Norma
 Gilda Nomacce as Gilda

Reception
The film received a score of 96% on review aggregator site Rotten Tomatoes and a 73 from Metacritic indicating positive reviews.

References

External links
 

2017 films
2017 fantasy films
2017 horror films
2017 LGBT-related films
2010s French films
2010s Portuguese-language films
2010s pregnancy films
Brazilian fantasy films
Brazilian horror films
Brazilian LGBT-related films
Films set in São Paulo
Films shot in São Paulo
French dark fantasy films
French LGBT-related films
French pregnancy films
Lesbian-related films
LGBT-related horror films
Werewolf films